Waya is an island in the southern part of the Yasawa Islands of Fiji. The island is part of Ba Province in the country's Western Division.

Geography
Waya is densely wooded with abundant natural water springs. There are four villages: Nalauwaki, Natawa, Waya Levu and Yalobi.

References

Ba Province
Islands of Fiji
Yasawa Islands